Hirsutine is an indole alkaloid isolated from Uncaria rhynchophylla and found in Yokukansan.

References

Tryptamine alkaloids
Quinolizidine alkaloids
Alkaloids found in plants